Zhongyuansaurus (meaning “Zhongyuan lizard”) is a monospecific genus of ankylosaurid dinosaur from Henan that lived during the Early Cretaceous (Aptian-Albian, ~125.0-100.5 Ma) in what is now the Haoling Formation. Zhongyuansaurus  is possibly a junior synonym of Gobisaurus, a basal ankylosaurid from the Ulansuhai Formation of Inner Mongolia.

Discovery and naming
The type species, Zhongyuansaurus luoyangensis, was named and described in 2007 by Xu and colleagues. The holotype specimen of Zhongyuansaurus, HGM 41HIII-0002, consists of a nearly complete skull, fragments of the lower jaw, a cervical neural spine, dorsal vertebrae, caudal vertebrae, posterior caudal centra, fused distal caudals, ribs, a humerus, both ischia, a pubis, and osteoderms. The specimen was obtained from the Haoling Formation of the Henan Province, Ruyang County. The specimen is currently housed at the Henan Province Geological Museum in China.

The generic name, Zhongyuansaurus, is derived from “Zhongyuan”, after the area south of Yellow River area, and the Greek word “sauros” (lizard). The specific name, luoyangensis, refers to the Luoyang area where the holotype was found.

In 2015, Victoria Arbour and Phillip J. Currie considered Zhongyuansaurus a junior synonym of Gobisaurus domoculus. The synonymization of Zhongyuansaurus is based on the holotype having all the diagnosable characteristics of Gobisaurus, except for features that cannot be assessed because of damage, like having vomers with elongated premaxillary processes.

Description
Zhongyuansaurus, like other ankylosaurids, had numerous osteoderms that would have been embedded in the dermis of the skin. Xu et al., 2007 recognised eight different sets of osteoderms pertaining to the holotype specimen. These osteoderms include: A large, thin irregular quadrangle osteoderms that may have been located on the front portion of the back; large, thick, irregular quadrangle osteoderms that had a flat surface, and front edges that extend considerably downwards; circular osteoderms that have an off centred keel on the outer surface; asymmetrical circular osteoderms that have a well developed keel on the outer surface; small circular osteoderms that have irregular grooves and no ridges on the outer surface; hollow cone osteoderms that have an irregular grooved sculpture on the outer surface; kidney shaped osteoderms that have the sides folded upwards and one edge being thicker than the other; ridge shaped osteoderms that have an irregular grooved sculpture on the outer surface.

As noted by Xu et al., an arrow-shaped bone with a pointed end was found near the region of the nasal. The authors interpreted it as a nasal horn homologous to other osteoderms that would have protruded from the nasal bone on an angle without being fused to the bone, a feature not seen in any ankylosaur. The authors suggested that the nasal horn may have been used for intraspecific and interspecific combat. 

The tail club of Zhongyuansaurus only preserves the “handle” and no “knob” osteoderms. The holotype preserves the terminal caudal vertebrae, so the absence of the “knob” osteoderms is not because the distal end of the tail is missing. Although the holotype specimen represents an immature individual based on cranial sutures, ontogeny does not seem to be an explanation for the absence of the knob osteoderms. Arbour & Currie, 2011 suggested that it was likely that the knob osteoderms were present in life and disarticulated from the handle after death but later ruled out the explanation as isolated tail club knobs from ankylosaurines often preserve some fragments of the distal caudal vertebrae or ossified tendons associated with the knob osteoderms.

Classification
Xu et al., 2007 originally considered Zhongyuansaurus to be a nodosaurid ankylosaur based on the skull proportions and the absence of a tail club. However, longer-than-wide skulls are a pleiomorphic trait of Ankylosauria and not a derived condition of nodosaurids. Carpenter et al., 2008 re-evaluated Zhongyuansaurus to the clade Shamosaurinae based on similarities with Shamosaurus. Thompson et al., 2012 recovered Zhongyuansaurus as a basal ankylosaurine and Arbour & Currie, 2015 later concluded that Zhongyuansaurus was a probable junior synonym of Gobisaurus.

A phylogenetic analysis conducted by Thompson et al., 2012 is reproduced below.

Paleoenvironment
The holotype specimen of Zhongyuansaurus was recovered from the Haoling Formation, which possibly dates to the Aptian and Albian stages of the Early Cretaceous. Zhongyuansaurus would have shared its habitat with the oviraptorid Luoyanggia, the sauropods Xianshanosaurus, Yunmenglong, Ruyangosaurus and Huanghetitan, an indeterminate ornithomimid, an indeterminate iguanodontian, and an indeterminate carcharodontosaurian.

See also

 Timeline of ankylosaur research

References

Ankylosaurids
Early Cretaceous dinosaurs of Asia
Fossil taxa described in 2007
Paleontology in Henan
Taxa named by Lü Junchang
Ornithischian genera